Palayam may refer to:

Palayam (film), a 1994 Malayalam film
Palayam, Kanyakumari, a village in Neyyoor town panchayat, Kanyakumari district, Tamil Nadu, India
Palayam, Perambalur, a village in Perambalur district, Tamil Nadu, India
Palayam, Thiruvananthapuram, a suburb of Thiruvananthapuram, Kerala, India
Palayam, Thiruvannamalai, a town panchayat and suburb of Thiruvannamalai UA, Tamil Nadu, India